E. D. Feehan Catholic High School is a Catholic high school on the west side of Saskatoon, Saskatchewan, Canada, in the neighbourhood known as Caswell Hill. It is operated by Greater Saskatoon Catholic Schools. It was the only Catholic high school on the city's west end until 2008 when Bethlehem High School, located in the Blairmore Suburban Centre, opened its doors.

History
The school is named in honour of Edward Daniel Feehan, the first superintendent of education of St. Paul R.C.S.S.D. No. 20 in the city of Saskatoon. He was also the first principal of St. Mary School, the first school in the division. As of 2019, Feehan is one of only two non-religious figures (the other being Governor General Georges Vanier) to have a school in the Saskatoon Catholic school system named after them; all other schools in the system are named for either religious leaders, saints, place names, or descriptive terms.

E. D. Feehan offers several courses for students in grades from nine to twelve, such as the standard educational programs, woodworking, cooking, and computer classes. It also offers opportunities in career pathways focused on residential home construction and health care.  The school also is known for its volunteer work with participants of the Special Olympics program along with its alternative program for students with special needs.

Its feeder schools are St. Edward School, École St. Gerard School, St. John School, St. Mary's Wellness & Education Centre, St. Maria Goretti Community School and St. Michael Community School.

E.D. Feehan CHS celebrated its 50th year celebration in education and excellence during the 2017–2018 school year.

Sports
The school athletic teams are the "Trojans" for the boys and the "Troys" for the girls. The school colours are royal blue and gold.

References

High schools in Saskatoon
Catholic secondary schools in Saskatchewan
Educational institutions established in 1967
1967 establishments in Saskatchewan